"Circle in the Sand" is a song recorded by American singer Belinda Carlisle for her second studio album, Heaven on Earth (1987). It was written by Rick Nowels, who also produced it, and Ellen Shipley. "Circle in the Sand" was the third single released from Heaven on Earth in May 1988. It reached number seven, becoming Carlisle's sixth and last top-ten hit in the United States. It also charted at number five in Canada, ending the year as the country's 69th-most-successful single.

Background and writing
"Circle in the Sand" was written by Rick Nowels and Ellen Shipley, who wrote many of Carlisle's hit singles in the late 1980s and into the early 1990s, including her signature song "Heaven Is a Place on Earth". The first known appearance of the song in progress is from the Lost Heaven Demos bootleg which features a solid drum beat, lead keyboard line and simple bass with no guitars present, and completed lyrics.  The final album version of the song features a unique lead keyboard theme provided by Thomas Dolby, combined with a thumping bassline and accentuated with swirling and shimmering guitar, including some played in reverse during the bridge.

Music video
The accompanying music video for the song was directed by Peter Care in Half Moon Bay, California and features Carlisle singing with various beach scenes in the background. The video mirrors the lyrical content with "cold wind", "tide moves in", and "waves crash" throughout. It makes effective use of video editing tricks by displaying different images of Carlisle and the surf on large sheets of paper hanging on a clothes line, with waves crashing in the background. The combined effect gives the semblance of a video-based collage.

The music video uses the single edit version of the song and was released by MCA Records in March 1988. Universal Records later posted the video for free viewing on YouTube in March 2007.

Track listing and formats

 US and Canadian 7-inch single; US cassette single
 "Circle in the Sand"
 "We Can Change"

 South African 7-inch single
A. "Circle in the Sand" – 4:26
B. "Nobody Owns Me" – 3:12

 International 7-inch single
A. "Circle in the Sand" – 3:20
B. "Circle in the Sand" (Seaside Mood Groove mix) – 3:51

 12-inch single
A1. "Circle in the Sand" (Beach Party mix) – 7:50
B1. "Circle in the Sand" (7-inch version) – 3:20
B2. "Circle in the Sand" (Seaside Mood Groove mix) – 3:51
 A 12-inch picture disc was also issued in the UK.

 UK CD single
 "Circle in the Sand" (7-inch version)
 "Circle in the Sand" (Seaside Mood Groove mix)
 "Circle in the Sand" (Sandblast multi-mix) (including "Heaven Is a Place on Earth" and "I Get Weak")
 "Circle in the Sand" (Beach Party mix)

 UK cassette single
 "Circle in the Sand" (7-inch version) – 3:20
 "Circle in the Sand" (Sandblast multi-mix) (including "Heaven Is a Place on Earth" and "I Get Weak") – 5:00
 "Heaven Is a Place on Earth" – 3:49

 Japanese mini-CD single
 "Circle in the Sand"
 "Circle in the Sand" (Beach Party mix)
 "Circle in the Sand" (Sandblast multi-mix) (including "Heaven Is a Place on Earth" and "I Get Weak")

Credits and personnel
 Belinda Carlisle – lead vocals
 Charles Judge – keyboards, drum programming
 John McCurry – electric guitars
 Thomas Dolby – keyboards
 John Pierce – bass
 Rick Nowels – keyboards, drum programming

Charts

Weekly charts

Year-end charts

References

 Discogs.com entry

External links
 

1988 singles
Belinda Carlisle songs
Songs written by Rick Nowels
Songs written by Ellen Shipley
Song recordings produced by Rick Nowels
1987 songs
MCA Records singles
Pop ballads
1980s ballads